Juan O'Donnell y Vargas, 3rd Duke of Tetuán (1864 – 1928) was an influential Spanish politician.

Biography 
O'Donnell was born in Madrid in 1864, and became the 3rd Duke of Tetuan, Grandee of Spain, 3rd Conde de Lucena, Cavalry Colonel, and the Director of the School of Military Riding. He was married in 1896 to Dona Maria Diaz de Mendoza y Aguado, of the noble house of Lalain and Balazote, Marquises of Fontanar. He was the son of Carlos O'Donnell y Abréu, 2nd Duke of Tetuan. He served as Minister for War under Miguel Primo de Rivera 1924 to 1928 when he died in office.

In 1895, as a lieutenant on the staff of General Martinez Campos, O'Donnell conducted Winston Churchill and Reginald Barnes on their military visit to Cuba. In his memoirs, Churchill commented on Juan O'Donnell's excellent spoken English.

In January 1922, he was the president of the "World Congress of the Irish Race" in Paris, a gathering of the global Irish diaspora discussing methods to aid in the economic development of an independent Ireland and its reconstruction following the end of the Civil War.

See also
Duke of Tetuán
O'Donnell dynasty

References

|-

|-

|

1864 births
1928 deaths
Counts of Lucena
Dukes of Tetuan
Spanish people of Irish descent